Amrumer Straße is a Berlin U-Bahn station located on the .

It was opened in 1961 and constructed by B. Grimmek. The name of the nearby hospital, Rudolf Virchow Hospital (Rudolf-Virchow-Krankenhaus), was part of the name until the end of the 1980s. Today it is still an important station for visitors of the hospital.

References 

U9 (Berlin U-Bahn) stations
Buildings and structures in Mitte
Railway stations in Germany opened in 1961